Norkys Yelitza Batista Villarroel (born August 30, 1977) is a Venezuelan actress, model and former beauty pageant titleholder.

Early life
Norkys was born in Caracas, Venezuela adopted by stepfather Luis Batista, a chief of staff of a company, and Migdalis Villarroel Batista, a housewife. She was raised in a low-income neighborhood in southwestern Caracas together with her 8 siblings.

Norkys rose to fame after becoming the first runner-up during the Miss Venezuela 1999 competition. She continued participating in beauty pageants and became first runner-up in the Reinado Internacional del Café pageant in 2000 where she was voted Most Beautiful Face and followed on to win the Miss Atlántico Internacional 2000 and Miss Latina Internacional 2000 respectively.

Career
She started her career by doing television commercials while studying Business Administration at the Universidad Nacional Experimental Simón Rodríguez. On television she continued working as a model on RCTV's shows such as Gente de la Manaña, Atrevete a Soñar as well as being co-host of the show La Tropa de Vacaciones on the same channel.

Norkys got her first acting role on the telenovela Juana La Virgen produced by RCTV in 2002. In 2004, she got her first starring role in the telenovela Estrambotica Anastasia where she played the role of triplets. In 2014, she joined Venevisión where she participated as a co-star in the telenovela Mi ex me tiene ganas and in 2013 played the role of the villain in the telenovela De todas maneras Rosa.

She currently continues touring in Venezuela and other countries with her stage play Orgasmos with actor Xavier Muñoz.  In 2014, she launched her underwear and bathing suit fashion line.

Personal life
After two years of dating, Norkys married dentist, model and actor Leonardo Luttinger on May 3, 2003.  She gave birth to their son, Sebastian Luttinger Batista on January 20, 2006.

Filmography

Television

Films
2006: Miranda
2007: 13 segundos
2008: El Sr. Presidente

Theatre
 Orgasmos

Awards and nominations

References

External links

1977 births
Living people
RCTV personalities
Venezuelan television actresses
Venezuelan telenovela actresses
Actresses from Caracas
Venezuelan beauty pageant winners
Venezuelan female models